The Children's Hospital Colorado Foundation, founded in 1978, is a 501(c)(3) non-profit organization advancing the mission of Children's Hospital Colorado, founded in 1908, and with roots as a pioneer summer tent hospital as early as 1897 in Denver, Colorado. Main hospital facilities are located on the Anschutz Medical Campus in Aurora, Colorado. Children's Colorado Foundation serves three purposes: To educate and engage with the community on the hospital’s behalf, to fundraise for the hospital, and to steward funds raised for children and families who need Children's Colorado.

List of events
Courage Classic
Children's Classic at Sanctuary
KALC ALICE 105.9 Cares for Kids
Climb for Courage at the US Air Force Academy
Miles for Tuesday
Annual Children's Gala
Colorado Gives Day

Financials 
In 2014, Children's Hospital Colorado cared for more than 217,000 kids. Distributions made by the Foundation in carrying out its function were $21 million in 2014. In addition, endowment contributions of $9.7 million during 2014 were transferred to Children's Hospital Colorado Health System, where they are invested and continue to support the Hospital. Ending Foundation net assets were $30.1 million at December 31, 2014.

References

External links 
 

Charities based in Colorado
Organizations established in 1978
Health charities in the United States
Medical and health organizations based in Colorado
1978 establishments in Colorado